Karim Dermane (born 26 December 2003) is a Togolese professional footballer who plays as a midfielder for Feyenoord and the Togo national team.

Club career
Dermane is a youth product of WAFA SC and Planète Foot Togo's youth academies. He signed his first professional contract with the Dutch club Feyenoord on 1 February 2022, keeping him at the club until June 2026.

International career
Dermane is a youth international for the Togo U23s, having represented them in 2022. He debuted for the senior Togo national team in a 3–0 friendly win over Sierra Leone on 24 March 2022. He scored his first goal for the country of 24 September 2022 in a friendly against Ivory Coast.

References

External links
 
 

2003 births
Living people
Togolese footballers
Togo international footballers
Togo youth international footballers
Association football midfielders
Eredivisie players
Feyenoord players
Togolese expatriate footballers
Togolese expatriates in the Netherlands
Expatriate footballers in the Netherlands
Togolese expatriates in Ghana
Expatriate footballers in Ghana